Quiet War may refer to:

 Laotian Civil War, the proxy war in the Kingdom of Laos between 1953 and 1975
 The Quiet War, a science fiction novel written by Paul McAuley
"The Quiet War" (song), a song by The Used from the 2017 album The Canyon
"The Quiet War", a song by rapper Michael Barber

See also
Silent Weapons for Quiet Wars, 1997 debut album from Wu-Tang affiliate Killarmy